Andrew Gordon Curtis Bierer (October 24, 1862 – February 21, 1951), more often written as A. G. C. Bierer, was a judge in Oklahoma Territory who served as an associate justice of the Territorial Supreme Court between 1894 and 1898.

Early life and education
Bierer was born in Uniontown, Pennsylvania on October 24, 1862 to a family of German descent. His father was Everard Bierer (1827–1910) and his mother was Ellen (née Smouse) Bierer (1832–1913).} His father and grandfather were both staunch Democrats and passed their political beliefs down to the son and grandson. The family migrated to Hiawatha, Kansas in 1865, where young Bierer was raised and graduated from high school.

After completing high school, Bierer began studying law. He was then admitted to the bar, then enrolled in the Georgetown University Law School in the District of Columbia, where he earned the Master of Arts degree in law in 1886. Moving to Garden City, Kansas, he built up a law practice (Brown, Bierer and Cotteral) and married Miss Nannie Stamper in 1888. In 1887, he ran for the position of Judge of the District Court.  He was appointed city attorney for Garden City in 1889 and served until he moved to Guthrie, Oklahoma (then known as Oklahoma Territory) in 1891.

Oklahoma Territory Supreme Court
Bierer was appointed as City Attorney shortly after moving to Guthrie, and served for one year. He then established the law firm Bierer and Cotteral, which became noted for the number of its members who went on to occupy high judicial positions.

Bierer himself was appointed an associate justice of the Oklahoma Territory Supreme Court in 1894, for a term ending in 1898.  James R. Keaton, who succeeded Bierer as head of the law firm, was also appointed to the Supreme Court in 1896. John H. Cotteral, the junior partner, was appointed United States District Judge for the Western District of Oklahoma in 1907.

Bierer stepped down from the court on February 16, 1898. He was succeeded by Bayard T. Hainer of Guthrie.

Post Supreme Court
According to author Michael J. Hightower, Bierer was a stockholder and attorney for the Bank of Indian Territory in  1911, when he got into a physical confrontation with a number of state banking inspectors who dropped in one morning to demand an emergency audit. Otherwise they would close the bank. Bierer called them, "... a set of thieves and burglars, and I dare you to try to close this bank."

Assistant State Banking Commissioner, R. L. Garnett, who was part of the group, attached a closure notice to the cashier's window and announced, "This bank is closed." Bierer  swore again, ripped down the notice and stuffed it into his pocket.  Unsure what to do with this man who was ready to defend his business with fisticuffs, the group apparently left without the audit it had demanded.

After his term on the Supreme Court expired, Bierer returned to private business, working with Frank Dale, another former justice of the Oklahoma Territory Supreme Court. In 1925, A. G. C. Bierer joined with his son, A. G. C. Bierer Jr., to form a new law firm, Bierer and Bierer, in Guthrie.

Death
Judge Bierer died at his home in Guthrie on February 21, 1951. His survivors were: A. G. C. Bierer Jr. (son) Mrs. Horace Taylor (daughter), and two grandsons, A. G. C. Bierer III and Alva McDonald Bierer. He was buried in Guthrie's Summit View Cemetery.

Notes

References 

1862 births
1951 deaths
People from Hiawatha, Kansas
Georgetown University Law Center alumni
People from Garden City, Kansas
People from Guthrie, Oklahoma
Justices of the Oklahoma Supreme Court
19th-century American lawyers
People from Uniontown, Pennsylvania
20th-century American lawyers
Kansas city attorneys
Oklahoma Democrats
Kansas Democrats
American people of German descent